Water damage describes various possible losses caused by water intruding where it will enable attack of a material or system by destructive processes such as rotting of wood, mold growth, bacteria growth, rusting of steel, swelling of composite woods, de-laminating of materials such as plywood, short-circuiting of electrical devices, etc.

The damage may be imperceptibly slow and minor such as water spots that could eventually mar a surface, or it may be instantaneous and catastrophic such as burst pipes and flooding. However fast it occurs, water damage is a major contributor to loss of property.

An insurance policy may or may not cover the costs associated with water damage and the process of water damage restoration. While a common cause of residential water damage is often the failure of a sump pump, many homeowner's insurance policies do not cover the associated costs without an addendum which adds to the monthly premium of the policy. Often the verbiage of this addendum is similar to "Sewer and Drain Coverage".

In the United States, those individuals who are affected by wide-scale flooding may have the ability to apply for government and FEMA grants through the Individual Assistance program. On a larger level, businesses, cities, and communities can apply to the FEMA Public Assistance program for funds to assist after a large flood. For example, the city of Fond du Lac Wisconsin received $1.2 million FEMA grant after flooding in June 2008. The program allows the city to purchase the water damaged properties, demolish the structures, and turn the former land into public green space.

Causes 
Water damage can originate by different sources such as a broken dishwasher hose, a washing machine overflow, a dishwasher leakage, broken/leaking pipes, flood waters, groundwater seepage, building envelope failures (leaking roof, windows, doors, siding, etc.) and clogged toilets. According to the Environmental Protection Agency, 13.7% of all water used in the home today can be attributed to plumbing leaks.  On average that is approximately 10,000 gallons of water per year wasted by leaks for each US home.  A tiny, 1/8-inch crack in a pipe can release up to 250 gallons of water a day. According to Claims Magazine in August 2000, broken water pipes ranked second to hurricanes in terms of both the number of homes damaged and the amount of claims (on average $50,000 per insurance claim) costs in the US. Experts suggest that homeowners inspect and replace worn pipe fittings and hose connections to all household appliances that use water at least once a year. This includes washing machines, dishwashers, kitchen sinks, and bathroom lavatories, refrigerator icemakers, water softeners, and humidifiers. A few US companies offer whole-house leak protection systems utilizing flow-based technologies. A number of insurance companies offer policyholders reduced rates for installing a whole-house leak protection system.

As far as insurance coverage is concerned, damage caused by surface water intrusion to the dwelling is considered flood damage and is normally excluded from coverage under traditional homeowners' insurance.  Surface water is water that enters the dwelling from the surface of the ground because of inundation or insufficient drainage and causes loss to the dwelling. Coverage for surface water intrusion to the dwelling would usually require a separate flood insurance policy.

Categories 
There are three basic categories of water damage, based on the level of contamination.

Category 1 Water - Refers to a source of water that does not pose substantial threat to humans and classified as "clean water". Examples are broken water supply lines, tub or sink overflows or appliance malfunctions that involves water supply lines.

Category 2 Water - Refers to a source of water that contains a significant degree of chemical, biological or physical contaminants and causes discomfort or sickness when consumed or even exposed to. Known as  "grey water". This type carries microorganisms and nutrients of micro-organisms. Examples are toilet bowls with urine (no feces), sump pump failures, seepage due to hydrostatic failure and water discharge from dishwashers or washing machines.

Category 3 Water - Known as "black water" and is grossly unsanitary. This water contains unsanitary agents, harmful bacteria and fungi, causing severe discomfort or sickness. Type 3 category are contaminated water sources that affect the indoor environment. This category includes water sources from sewage, seawater, rising water from rivers or streams, storm surge, ground surface water or standing water. Category 2 Water or Grey Water that is not promptly removed from the structure and or have remained stagnant may be re classified as Category 3 Water. Toilet back flows that originates from beyond the toilet trap is considered black water contamination regardless of visible content or color.

Classes 

Class of water damage is determined by the probable rate of evaporation based on the type of materials affected, or wet, in the room or space that was flooded. Determining the class of water damage is an important first step, and will determine the amount and type of equipment utilized to dry-down the structure.

Class 1 - Slow Rate of Evaporation. Affects only a portion of a room. Materials have a low permeance/porosity. Minimum moisture is absorbed by the materials. **IICRC s500 2016 update adds that class 1 be indicated when <5% of the total square footage of a room (ceiling+walls+floor) are affected **

Class 2 - Fast Rate of Evaporation. Water affects the entire room of carpet and cushion. May have wicked up the walls, but not more than 24 inches.   **IICRC s500 2016 update adds that class 2 be indicated when 5% to 40% of the total square footage of a room (ceiling+walls+floor) are affected **

Class 3 - Fastest Rate of Evaporation. Water generally comes from overhead, affecting the entire area; walls, ceilings, insulation, carpet, cushion, etc.  **IICRC s500 2016 update adds that class 3 be indicated when >40% of the total square footage of a room (ceiling+walls+floor) are affected **

Class 4 - Specialty Drying Situations. Involves materials with a very low permeance/porosity, such as hardwood floors, concrete, crawlspaces, gypcrete, plaster, etc. Drying generally requires very low specific humidity to accomplish drying.

Restoration 

Water damage restoration can be performed by property management teams, building maintenance personnel, or by the homeowners themselves; however, contacting a certified professional water damage restoration specialist is often regarded as the safest way to restore water damaged property. Certified professional water damage restoration specialists utilize psychrometrics to monitor the drying process.

Standards and regulation 
While there are currently no government regulations in the United States dictating procedures, two certifying bodies, the Institute of Inspection Cleaning and Restoration Certification (IICRC) and the RIA, do recommend standards of care. The current IICRC standard is ANSI/IICRC S500-2021. It is the collaborative work of the IICRC, SCRT, IEI, IAQA, and NADCA.

Fire and Water Restoration companies are regulated by the appropriate state's Department of Consumer Affairs - usually the state contractors license board. In California, all Fire and Water Restoration companies must register with the California Contractors State License Board.  Presently, the California Contractors State License Board has no specific classification for "water and fire damage restoration."

Procedures 
Water damage restoration is often prefaced by a loss assessment and evaluation of affected materials. The damaged area is inspected with water sensing equipment such as probes and other infrared tools in order to determine the source of the damage and possible extent of areas affected. Emergency mitigation services are the first order of business.  Controlling the source of water, removal of non-salvageable materials, water extraction and pre-cleaning of impacted materials are all part of the mitigation process. Restoration services would then be rendered to the property in order to dry the structure, stabilize building materials, sanitize any affected or cross-contaminated areas, and deodorize all affected areas and materials. After the labor is completed, water damage equipment including air movers, air scrubbers, dehumidifiers, wood floor drying systems, and sub-floor drying equipment is left in the residence. The goal of the drying process is to stabilize the moisture content of impacted materials below 15%, the generally accepted threshold for microbial amplification. Industry standards state that drying vendors should return  at regular time intervals, preferably every twenty-four hours, to monitor the equipment, temperature, humidity, and moisture content of the affected walls and contents.

See also 
 Indoor mold

References

Moisture protection
Building engineering